Mariya Valeryevna Aronova is a Russian stage actress and a popular TV show host. She has appeared in more than 80 films.

Early life
Aronova was born in Dolgoprudny, Moscow Oblast, Russian SFSR, Soviet Union (now Russia).

Career
Since 1994 Mariya Aronova has been member of the troupe at Vakhtangov Theatre in Moscow.

Awards and honours
People's Artist of Russia (2012)
People's Artist of the Republic of North Ossetia–Alania (2015)
Laureate of the State Prize of the Russian Federation, named after Konstantin Sergeyevich Stanislavski (1994)
Nika Award (2007)
Golden Eagle Award (2007, 2022)
Crystal Turandot Award (1998)

Selected filmography

Film

Dubbing roles
 The Nutcracker and the Mouseking (2004 animated feature films) — Mouseilda, her shadow and the Prince's nanny (ru)
 Zootopia (2016 animated feature films) — Bellwether
ChalkZone— Milerd Tabootie

References

External links
 
 Mariya Aronova on kino-teatr.ru

1972 births
Living people
People from Dolgoprudny
Russian film actresses
Russian stage actresses
Russian television actresses
Actresses from Moscow
20th-century Russian actresses
21st-century Russian actresses
Russian voice actresses
Russian women television presenters
Honored Artists of the Russian Federation
People's Artists of Russia
Recipients of the Nika Award